Mount Thyestes is a  mountain summit located in the Tantalus Range, in Tantalus Provincial Park, in southwestern British Columbia, Canada. Precipitation runoff from the peak drains into tributaries of the Squamish River. The first ascent of the mountain was made in 1942 by R. McLellan, H. Parliament, and F. Roots. The mountain was named for Thyestes, son of Pelops and grandson of Tantalus according to Greek mythology.  The mountain's name was officially adopted on June 6, 1957, by the Geographical Names Board of Canada.

Climate

Based on the Köppen climate classification, Mount Thyestes is located in the marine west coast climate zone of western North America. Most weather fronts originate in the Pacific Ocean, and travel east toward the Coast Mountains where they are forced upward by the range (Orographic lift), causing them to drop their moisture in the form of rain or snowfall. As a result, the Coast Mountains experience high precipitation, especially during the winter months in the form of snowfall. Temperatures can drop below −20 °C with wind chill factors below −30 °C. The months July through September offer the most favorable weather for climbing Thyestes.

See also
 
 Geography of British Columbia
 Geology of British Columbia

References

External links
 Weather: Mount Thyestes

One-thousanders of British Columbia
Pacific Ranges
Sea-to-Sky Corridor
New Westminster Land District